Nianasso is a village and seat of the Commune of Kassarola, in the Cercle of San in the Ségou Region of southern-central Mali.

References

Populated places in Ségou Region